Palmerdale is an area in Jefferson County, Alabama, United States. Most of the community falls within the city limits of Pinson.

The community traces its history back to the Great Depression and President Franklin Delano Roosevelt's Resettlement Administration, part of the New Deal. Palmerdale Homestead was established to bring impoverished people out of urban areas, setting them up with small farms in nearby rural areas. Originally named Palmer Station for the Louisville and Nashville Railroad station that served the area, the name was changed to Palmerdale in the 1930s.

Palmerdale became part of Pinson when the latter became incorporated in 2004.

Palmerdale has a post office with ZIP code 35123.

See also
 Palmerdale Homestead Community Center

References

Unincorporated communities in Jefferson County, Alabama
Unincorporated communities in Alabama